Delhi-6  is a 2009 Indian Hindi-language drama film directed by Rakesh Omprakash Mehra. The film stars Abhishek Bachchan as an NRI who arrives in India with his ailing grandmother (played by Waheeda Rehman) and begins discovering his roots before getting embroiled in a religious dispute involving a mysterious monkey-like attacker. The film co-stars Sonam Kapoor, Aditi Rao Hydari, Rishi Kapoor, Supriya Pathak, Atul Kulkarni, Pavan Malhotra, Deepak Dobriyal, Divya Dutta, Vijay Raaz and Om Puri. The number 6 refers to the Postal Index Number (PIN) of the Chandni Chowk area of Old Delhi, a shortened form of 110006. It is Mehra's third film after Aks (2001) and Rang De Basanti (2006). The film's soundtrack, composed by A. R. Rahman, was a commercial success and received positive reviews from music critics upon release. 

Following international premieres at the Dubai International Film Festival as well as the Museum of Modern Art, Delhi-6 was released on 20 February 2009 and was a commercial failure at the box office. Despite failing commercially, it received mixed reviews from critics, with praise for its soundtrack and performances of the cast, but criticism for its story, screenplay and pacing. 

At the 57th National Film Awards, Delhi-6 won  Best Production Design (Samir Chanda) in addition to winning the Nargis Dutt Award for Best Feature Film on National Integration. The version submitted to the National Awards featured an alternate ending favored by Mehra, which was unavailable to the general public and shown only in a limited one-week theatrical release as well as the Venice Film Festival. Additionally, at the 55th Filmfare Awards, the film received 7 nominations, including Best Supporting Actress (Dutta), and won 3 awards, including Best Music Director (A. R. Rahman).  The film has over the years become notable for its soundtrack.

Plot
Roshan accompanies his dying grandmother Annapurna to their ancestral property in Old Delhi where he is initially stunned by the mad rush of neighbours: Ali Baig the renaissance man, feuding brothers Madangopal and Jaigopal, their wives and families, Mamdu the confectioner, Gobar the simpleton, Sethji and many others. 

Roshan accompanies his grandmother to the Ramleelas, hangs out at Mamdu's sweet stall, plays with the children, and gradually becomes steeped in the culture. When Annapurna faints due to fluctuating blood sugar levels and everyone scrambles to get her to a hospital, Roshan finds the roads choked by traffic because of an impromptu ceremony around a cow in labour; he is further surprised when his grandmother, despite her stupor, stumbles forth to seek the blessings of the cow and the local police seem to encourage the practice. Roshan begins to understand the feuds and social issues in the community.

Madangopal's sister Rama is unwed and Jaigopal's electrical business is going nowhere. The lecherous old local money lender Lala Bhairam's wife Shashi is having an affair with a young photo-studio hand Suresh, a double timer also pursuing Madangopal's daughter Bittu who secretly prepares to audition for a popular reality show Indian Idol. Roshan is surprised to learn that Ali Baig fancied his mother many years ago and has since never married. Roshan also comes to empathize with the lower-caste trash collector girl Jalebi, and crosses paths with the loutish inspector Ranvijay who blithely stretches his authorities to manhandle the locals.

On the other hand, the media is all abuzz with tales of a miscreant known as the "Kala Bandar" who attacks, steals and has caused the death of a few innocent people. After some initial friction, Roshan and Bittu warm to each other. Roshan intervenes when he learns of Madangopal trying to get Bittu married against her wishes, but earns Madangopal's wrath. While supporting her dreams, he gradually begins to fall in love with her. Bittu too begins to reciprocate but is left saddened by the news of his return to America. Later when Roshan confronts Bittu after Madangopal fixes her marriage forcibly, he is disappointed when she expresses her plan of eloping with Suresh in order to achieve her dreams, unaware of his hidden affair with Shashi and his other intentions. 

Around this time, the Kala Bandar attacks Old Delhi. In order to exorcise the demonic influence of the Kala Bandar, the locals bring in a tantrik Shani baba who speculates that the local mosque must have been built over the ruins of a temple that was demolished for the purpose, thus initiating a vicious cycle of animosity in the previously harmonious Hindu-Muslim community. After the initial peaceful demonstrations, a mob goes on rampage and attacks some of the Muslims and their shops, including Mamdu's sweet shop. This prompts Mamdu to set fire to the tree temple. Roshan attempts to make peace but is rebuffed because of his mixed religious parentage. The locals ultimately settle on the fact that the Kala Bandar is hiding out in the sooni galli (a dark lane known to harbour evil presences), and command Gobar to fetch a lock of hair from the evil enemy so that the tantrik can burn it and complete the exorcism.

Roshan realizes his affection for Bittu. He decides to stop her and confess his love upon Ali Baig's advice. So he dons a monkey outfit, stealthily following Bittu by leaping across the rooftops. In the meantime Gobar ventures into the sooni galli where Jalebi gives him a lock of her hair so he may return in triumph and bring peace to the community. At that moment, Roshan (in his monkey outfit) intercedes in Bittu and Suresh's rendezvous and causes the cowardly Suresh to flee. Bittu raises a loud alarm before Roshan unmasks himself, expresses his feelings for her which she reciprocates. The angry locals storm the place and beat up Roshan, believing him to the Kala Bandar, before Mamdu shoots him. Gobar then proclaims that the Kala Bandar is in fact the vices residing inside the people of Delhi 6 and something they must defeat within themselves. The neighborhood realizes this and arranges for an ambulance. Roshan does not respond to the treatment, leaving people to believe that he died. In the meanwhile, the nearly dying Roshan meets his dead grandfather who reveals that there is a Kala Bandar in his own heart and that is why he wanted to ask forgiveness to his daughter-in-law, Roshan's mother, for not accepting her inter-religious marriage. Soon, he responds to the treatment and survives, much to everyone's happiness. He remembers Ali Baig's words, "Who can ever wish to leave Delhi's lanes?" rejoicing all with his wish to stay there forever. Roshan narrates that it is the Kala Bandar which is like the demon king Ravana, which can create hatred and divide among human beings and at the end he concludes that he returned to his home; New York City.

Alternate ending
Gobar concludes it is the Kala Bandar (inside everyone's hearts) who killed Roshan. Meeting his dead grandfather in a dream, Roshan searches for his phone, which in reality drops from his hand as the screen cuts black. He is revealed to be dead after his ashes are immersed in a river through the same earthen pot his grandmother had purchased for her own ashes to be immersed after her death. The narration closes with Roshan recalling her words, "You will merge with the soil of which you are born."

Cast

 Waheeda Rehman as Annapurna Mehra (Dadi)
 Abhishek Bachchan as Roshan Mehra
 Sonam Kapoor as Bittu Sharma
 Rishi Kapoor as Ali Beg
 Om Puri as Madangopal Sharma 
 Divya Dutta as Jalebi
 Tanvi Azmi as Fatima Mehra
 Atul Kulkarni as Gobar
 Aditi Rao Hydari as Rama Sharma
 Supriya Pathak as Vimla Sharma 
 Sheeba Chaddha as Rajjo Bhabhi
 Deepak Dobriyal as Mamdu
 K.K. Raina as Haji Sulaiman
 Pavan Malhotra as Jai Gopal Sharma 
 Amitabh Bachchan as Mr. Mehra, Roshan's grandfather (special appearance)
 Vinayak Doval as Bobby
 Prem Chopra as Lala Bhairam
 Vijay Raaz as Inspector Ranvijay Thakur 
 Akhilendra Mishra as Tantrik Baba
 Cyrus Sahukar as Suresh
 Geeta Bisht as Shashi
 Daya Shankar Pandey as Kumar Kulshrestha
 Raghubir Yadav as singer at ramleela

Production

Development and casting
In the early stages of development it was rumored that Rakeysh was going to cast newcomers for his next film. It was even reported that Aamir Khan's nephew Imran Khan would make his debut with Delhi-6 but this was later revealed to be Jaane Tu Ya Jaane Na (2008). Frequent changes in casting made headlines, with Hrithik Roshan being set to play the main character and then being reportedly replaced by Ranbir Kapoor. Even Akshay Kumar was supposed to play the lead but refused. Rakeysh Omprakash Mehra stated that Abhishek Bachchan was always the first choice for Delhi-6. Date problems for Abhishek Bachchan caused delays, but it all worked out in the end with Abhishek portraying the lead actor. Sonam Kapoor was paired as the leading female character opposite Abhishek Bachchan. Rishi Kapoor and Tanvi Azmi are also a part of the film. The film went on the floors on 20 February 2008. Amitabh Bachchan plays the grandfather to Roshan, played by Abhishek Bachchan, whereas Waheeda Rehman plays the grandmother of the same.

Filming
Production designer Samir Chanda, who had earlier worked with Mehra on Aks and Rang De Basanti, recreated inner lanes of Old Delhi at Sambhar, a town in Rajasthan with similar architecture. Also for some scenes, historic Jama Masjid was digitally added to the frame as a backdrop. Editing was done by Meghna Aschit and Rakesh's wife Bharti. In an interview, Rakesh said that he was not involved with the editing.

Promotion
Delhi-6 was first unveiled on the Dubai International Film Festival. Following the screening was an interactive question and answer round, consisting of the director with the rest of the star cast and a vast audience. During this interaction, Rakeysh spoke about his key influences and the theme of the film, while actors described their experience of working with Rakeysh. A video featuring Abhishek and Sonam's interview can be watched in the reference along with this section. The official trailer was released on 4 January 2009 which featured scenes from Delhi along with Jama Masjid, theatre groups, Red Fort at night, Sonam Kapoor coming out of a public escalator at Central Park in Delhi and finally Abhishek watching Sonam dancing with the pigeon "Masakali" on her head.

Release
The film was supposed to be released on 13 February 2009 to avoid clash with Billu Barber, but A. R. Rahman's continued absence from the project led to a delayed-release. The background score remained incomplete and delayed-release by one week. Delhi-6 was finally released on 20 February 2009 and premiered in New Delhi on 19 February 2009. It had its first screening on 15 February 2009 in New York.

Reception

Critical reception
As of 11 March 2009, Rotten Tomatoes has given the film a 40% rating with 3 fresh and 6 rotten reviews.

Pratim D. Gupta of The Telegraph gave two thumbs up, calling it a must-watch for just its "overwhelming audio-visual eruption". Nikhat Kazmi of Times of India rated it three out of five stars, saying, "Watch it for the message of Delhi-6 and the ekdum desi India-feel". Anupama Chopra of NDTV said that the film is a noble failure:  "Delhi-6 is ambitious and well-intentioned, but good intentions don’t always translate into good cinema". Rajeev Masand of CNN-IBN gave it 3 stars, saying that it's a story with heart and Delhi-6 isn't great cinema like Mehra's Rang De Basanti and has a frustrating climax. Rachel Saltz of The New York Times stated "Delhi-6 can be maddeningly vague, which robs its ending...of the impact it intends". Shashi Baliga of Hindustan Times gave the film 3 out of 5 saying "Mehra sure has his heart in the right place. But couldn’t he have allowed himself… and us, a little more fun?" Arthur J Pais of Rediff.com gave a much better verdict remarking the film's innovative style and storyline. Amanda Sodhi posted an in-depth write-up about Delhi-6 on PassionForCinema.com, defending it against flak it was receiving.

Music

A. R. Rahman is the music director of this film. Prasoon Joshi is the lyricist. The music was released on 14 January 2009 at the Indian Idol 4 competition. The first video of the song "Masakali" was released featuring Sonam and Abhishek with a pigeon. However, the song was not part of the original film. According to the director, "The song was not really meant to be part of the narrative. I mean, who would think of putting in a song about a dove in a film like Delhi-6? It just happened. When I came to the pre-climax portion of my script, I was stuck. I needed a continuity link taking the narrative to its finale". Other videos released include the title track "Delhi-6", the romantic interlude "Rehna Tu" as well as the folky "Genda Phool," an adaptation of a folk song from Chhattisgarh.

Track listing
The official track listing.

Inspiration
Reports of Kala Bandar (Black Monkey) attacks in the city of Delhi as shown in the film are inspired by real reports of much publicized monkey or monkeyman attacks in and around Delhi in 2001.

Awards and nominations

See also
Dadaria

References

External links
 
 Delhi-6 at Planet Bollywood

2009 films
Indian drama films
2000s Hindi-language films
Films set in Delhi
Films shot in Delhi
Films shot in Rajasthan
Films scored by A. R. Rahman
Films shot in New York City
UTV Motion Pictures films
Films whose production designer won the Best Production Design National Film Award
Best Film on National Integration National Film Award winners
Films directed by Rakeysh Omprakash Mehra